A. G. Rathnamala (1931 – 3 July 2007) was an Indian stage drama artist and playback singer who has recorded over 500 songs in Tamil, Telugu, Malayalam and Kannada language films.

Career life

Stage Drama
When she was in the drama troupe of M. G. Ramachandran, she acted as his pair of in the drama named Inba Kanavu. Apart from this she acted along with T. R. Mahalingam in the drama Or Iravu. She was also acted with K. R. Ramasamy's drama troupe.

En Thangai was based on T. S. Natarajan's play of the same name. Sivaji Ganesan is the hero in the stage drama and she performed as his younger sister. Later she joined Sivaji Ganesan's drama troupe and enacted the role of Jakkamma in the drama Veerapandiya Kattbomman.

Music composers she sang for

Playback singers she sang with
She had many solo songs but also sang with other singers. She was very popular with comedy songs.
She sang immemorable duets mostly with S. C. Krishnan. She also sang with all the comedian singers such as J. P. Chandrababu, Thiruchi Loganathan, K. R. Chellamuthu, A. L. Raghavan, C. S. Pandiyan, S. V. Ponnusamy, K. Sarangapani, V. T. Rajagopalan, C. Thangkappan, Madhavapeddi Satyam, Pithapuram Nageswara Rao & K. H. Reddy. Others are T. M. Soundararajan, Seerkazhi Govindarajan, C. S. Jayaraman, C. R. Subburaman, V. J. Varma, S. V. Ramanan and G. K. Venkatesh.

She also sang duets with female singers with most notably with K. Jamuna Rani, A. P. Komala & P. Leela. Others include M. L. Vasanthakumari, Jikki, M. S. Rajeswari, T. V. Rathnam, K. Rani, T. S. Bagavathi, Soolamangalam Jayalakshmi, Soolamangalam Rajalakshmi, P. A. Periyanayaki, N. L. Ganasaraswathi, U. R. Chandra, S. J. Kantha, G. Kasthoori, Sundaramma, Kamala, Gomathi, Udutha Sarojini & M. S. Padma.

The singing actors she sang with were T. R. Mahalingam, J. P. Chandrababu, N. S. Krishnan, T. A. Mathuram. C. S. Pandiyan, P. Bhanumathi and K. Sarangapani.

Filmography

References

1931 births
2007 deaths
Indian women playback singers
Tamil playback singers
Women musicians from Tamil Nadu
Singers from Tamil Nadu
20th-century Indian singers
21st-century Indian women singers
21st-century Indian singers
20th-century Indian women singers